A pentadecahedron (or pentakaidecahedron) is a polyhedron with 15 faces. No pentadecahedron is regular; hence, the name is ambiguous. There are numerous topologically distinct forms of a pentadecahedron, for example the tetradecagonal pyramid, and tridecagonal prism.

Convex
There are 23,833,988,129 topologically distinct convex pentadecahedra, excluding mirror images, having at least 10 vertices. (Two polyhedra are "topologically distinct" if they have intrinsically different arrangements of faces and vertices, such that it is impossible to distort one into the other simply by changing the lengths of edges or the angles between edges or faces.)

References

What Are Polyhedra?, with Greek Numerical Prefixes

External links
 Self-Dual Pentadecahedra, 

Polyhedra